Phianna was an American luxury automobile manufactured from 1916 to 1922, first in Newark, New Jersey and then Long Island City, New York.

History

Phianna Motors Company 
The Phianna Motors Company was created in 1916 by R. J. Metzler.  Metzler had acquired the SGV's equipment and production line in May 1915 prior to the company being wound up.  SGV had fallen deeply into debt.  Metzler partnered with industrialists John A. Bell and T. M. Pepperday, who moved production from Reading to Newark, New Jersey.  The name Phianna originated from one of the companies twin daughters, Phyllis and Anna.

Phianna made one car based on the SGV, before changing to it own models.  The 1916 Phianna was a $3,600 town car. The bodies were custom-built and chassis were available for coachwork. By 1917 Phianna's ranged in price from $5,000 to $6,000, .

M. H. Carpenter Company 
With the United States entry into World War I, in 1918 the Phianna factory was used to make tools and dies for the Wright-Martin Aircraft Company. The Phianna company put its assets up for sale and Miles Harold Carpenter, an automobile enthusiast who had purchased a Phianna, with assistance from a Texas rancher, Carl M Worsham, acquired the assets.  A new plant was set up at the end of 59th Street, Long Island City.

Miles Carpenter was an automotive designer who had worked for Pierce Arrow and Chalmers among others in a varied career. The Phianna was hand-built including it's four-cylinder engine of polished aluminum and a wooden cooling fan designed by Fred Charavey. An update version on a 125-inch wheelbase and a new radiator design changing from the Brewster style oval to a more popular Rolls-Royce style was ready for the 1919 auto shows. The Phianna was a prestige car, prices ranging from $6,000 for a standard brougham, to $9,500 for a special touring car, to $11,500 for a limousine.

Innovative safety glass was introduced in 1919 as were turn signals and stop lights. Carpenter changed the company's motto from The Foreign Car Made in America to America's Representative Among the World's Finest Cars. The company also introduced an innovative six-cylinder engine in 1919 that saw limited production. Phianna could list owners such as the King of Spain, the President of Brazil and Bainbridge Colby, Secretary of State.

Miles Carpenter built Phiannas for Glenn Curtiss using the OX-5 engine with a view to setting up a Curtiss car company.  With the depression of 1921 Carpenter, on advice from Mortimer L. Schiff, decided to stop production and close down the business. The final car was made in 1922 for John F Norman.

Gallery

References

1916 establishments in New Jersey
Vehicle manufacturing companies disestablished in 1922
Defunct motor vehicle manufacturers of the United States
Luxury motor vehicle manufacturers
Luxury vehicles
Vintage vehicles
1910s cars
1920s cars
Motor vehicle manufacturers based in New York (state)
Coachbuilders of the United States
Vehicle manufacturing companies established in 1916
Cars introduced in 1916